Alvin Jackson may refer to:
Alvin Ray Jackson (born 1980), American arena football linebacker
Alvin B. Jackson, American politician from Utah
Alvin Jackson (musician), jazz bassist
Alvin Jackson (historian), University of Edinburgh historian of Britain and Ireland